Golot cheese, is one of the most important traditional cheeses produced in the region of East Black Sea, Turkey. The average composition of Golot cheese is 43.51% total solids, 5.31% fat, 33.64% protein, and 3.12% salt. The mixture of morning and night milk is heated to 37°C and separated from the fat. An appropriate amount of rennet and yogurt whey are added to the non-fat milk and then heated until the precipitation (65-70°C). The curd is then transferred into the cheesecloth for whey drainage about 15 hours. The cheeses are placed in a  polypropylene bags; granular cheeses are added between each Golot cheese and waited for one week. The Golot cheeses are pressed into wooden containers with cover and ripened between 6 months and 1 year based on the consumption period.

References

Yazici, F. ve Dervisoglu, M. “Proteolysis in Golot Cheese.” Acta Alimentaria, 31 (3),
307-313 (2002). 

"The Indispensable Ingredient of Turkish Tables: Cheese." Turkish Cultural Foundation.

Turkish cheeses